Pedro Luciano Agüero Ceballos (born 13 December 1948) is an Argentine boxer. He competed in the 1968 Summer Olympics.

References

1948 births
Living people
Boxers at the 1968 Summer Olympics
Argentine male boxers
Olympic boxers of Argentina
Sportspeople from Mendoza, Argentina
Lightweight boxers